The Gang Show is a 1937 British musical film  about a Boy Scout Troop who stage a variety show to raise funds, when the lease of their meeting place expires.

The film was a vehicle for material from Ralph Reader's Gang Shows that had been successful on the stage in London's West End since 1932; the songs included the Gang Show anthem; "Crest of a Wave". Shot at Pinewood Studios, the film premiered at the Lyceum Theatre, London on 13 April 1937, the only occasion that the theatre was used as a cinema. It was released in New York in December 1938 under the shortened title The Gang.

Cast
 Ralph Reader as Skipper
 Gina Malo as Marie
 Stuart Robinson as Raydon
 Richard Ainley as Whipple
 Leonard Snelling as Len
 Syd Palmer as Syd
 Roy Emerton as the Proprietor
 Percy Walsh as McCulloch

References

1937 films
1937 musical films
Films directed by Alfred J. Goulding
British black-and-white films
Scouting in popular culture
British musical films
1930s British films